The 2023 European Judo Championships will be held at the Sud de France Arena in Montpellier, France, from 3 to 5 November 2023 as part of the IJF World Tour and during the 2024 Summer Olympics qualification period.

References

External links
 

 
European Judo Championships
European Championships
European Championships
Judo
Judo
European Judo Championships
European Judo Championships
Judo in France
Judo
Judo European Judo Championships